Pheak Rady (born January 22, 1989) is a former Cambodian footballer who last played for Cambodian Tiger. He was called up for Cambodia national football team in 2007.

Honours

Club
National Defense Ministry
Hun Sen Cup: 2010

References

External links
 

1989 births
Living people
Cambodian footballers
Cambodia international footballers
Association football forwards
Boeung Ket Rubber Field
People from Kandal province
Angkor Tiger FC players